A by-election was held for the Australian House of Representatives seat of Maranoa on 30 July 1921. This was triggered by the death of Labor MP Jim Page.

The by-election was won by Country Party candidate James Hunter, giving the Country Party their first seat in Queensland.

Former Queensland Premier and Labor MP T. J. Ryan contracted pneumonia while campaigning for the Labor candidate William Dunstan, leading to Ryan's own death.

Results

References

1921 elections in Australia
Queensland federal by-elections
1920s in Queensland